Villa Rica may refer to:

 Villa Rica, Georgia, United States
 Villa Rica, Cauca, Colombia
 Villa Rica District, Peru
 Villa Rica, Paraguay
 Veracruz, Veracruz, Mexico, originally Villa Rica de la Vera Cruz

See also 
 Villaricca, Italy
 Villarica (disambiguation)
 Villarrica (disambiguation)